The following is a list of awards and nominations received by American DJ/producer duo The Chainsmokers.

American Music Awards

ASCAP Music Awards

ASCAP Pop Music Awards

APRA Awards

Billboard Music Awards

BMI Awards 
The BMI Awards are annual award ceremonies based in the United States, honoring the industry's top songwriters, publishers and top 50 best-performing songs of the year. .

DJ Awards

DJ Magazine top 100 DJs

Electronic Music Awards & Foundation Show

GAFFA Awards

GAFFA Awards (Denmark)
Delivered since 1991. The GAFFA Awards (Danish: GAFFA Prisen) are a Danish award that rewards popular music awarded by the magazine of the same name.

Gaygalan Awards
Since 1999, the Gaygalan Awards are a Swedish accolade presented by the QX magazine.

Global Awards

Grammy Awards

iHeartRadio Music Awards

iHeartRadio Titanium Awards 
iHeartRadio Titanium Awards are awarded to an artist when their song reaches 1 Billion Spins across iHeartRadio Stations.

International Dance Music Awards

Kids' Choice Awards

United States

Latin American Music Awards

LOS40 Music Awards

MTV Awards

MTV Europe Music Awards

MTV Video Music Awards

MTVU Woodie Awards

MTV Italia Awards

MTV Video Music Awards Japan

Mxy Music Awards

|-
|2017
|Closer ft. Halsey
|Favorite International Video
|  
|}

Much Music Video Awards

|-
|2016
|rowspan="3"|The Chainsmokers 
|rowspan="2"|International Duo or Group of the Year
|  
|-
|2017
|  
|-
|2018
|Fan Fave Duo or Group
|  
|}

Nickelodeon Kids' Choice Awards

|-
|2018
|The Chainsmokers 
|Favorite Music Group
|  
|-
|2019
|Themselves
|Favorite Music Group
| 
|}

NME Awards

|-
|2017
|The Chainsmokers 
|Worst Band
|  
|}

NRJ Music Awards

People's Choice Awards

Radio Disney Music Awards

Swiss Music Awards

Telehit Awards

|-
| align="center"| 2016
|rowspan="2"|The Chainsmokers
|DJ of the Year
|
|-
| align="center"| 2017
|DJ of the Year
|
|-

Teen Choice Awards

|-
| align="center"| 2014
|"#Selfie"
|Choice Music: Electronic Music Dance Song
|
|-
|align="center"| 2016
|rowspan="2"|The Chainsmokers
|rowspan="2"|Choice Music Group
|
|-
| rowspan="2" align="center"| 2017
|
|-
|"Closer" (featuring Halsey)
|Choice Song: Group
|
|-
|rowspan="2" align="center"| 2018
|rowspan="2"|The Chainsmokers
|rowspan="1"|Choice Electronic/Dance Artist
|
|-
|rowspan="1"|Choice Summer Group
|
|-

WDM Radio Awards

References 

Awards
Lists of awards received by American musician
Lists of awards received by musical group